Trachischium laeve, also known as the olive oriental slender snake, is a species of colubrid snake found in Nepal and Indian Himalaya.

Geographic range
It is found in India (western Himalayas) and Nepal.

Description
The dorsum is uniform grayish brown. The throat, belly, underside of tail, and first row of dorsal scales are yellowish.

One preocular; one postocular; temporals 1+1.5 upper labials, 3rd and 4th entering the orbit. Dorsal scales very smooth, shiny, without apical pits, in 13 rows. The male does not have any keels on the dorsal scales in the anal/basicaudal region. Ventrals 147–149; anal divided; subcaudals divided 33–39.

There are 17 maxillary teeth in a continuous series, the posterior slightly shorter than the anterior. The mandibular teeth are all the same length.

The measurements of the type specimens are as follows: a male, 337 mm (13 inches) SVL (Snout to Vent Length), tail 53 mm (2 inches); a female, 502 mm (19 inches) SVL, tail 70 mm (2 inches).

References

 Peracca, M.G. 1904. Nouvelles espèces d'Ophidiens d'Asie et d'Amerique, faisant partie de la collection du Museum d'histoire naturelle de Genève. Rev. Suisse Zool. 12: 663-668
 Tillack, F. & Shah, K.B. 2002. Zur Verbreitung von Trachischium laeve PERACCA 1904 mit ersten Nachweisen für den zentralen Nepal-Himalaya (Reptilia: Serpentes: Colubridae). Sauria 24 (1): 39-44
 Wall, F. 1911. A new snake from the Western Himalayas. J. Bombay nat. Hist. Soc. 21: 201
 Sharma, R.C. Handbook of Indian Snakes. Akhil Books. New Delhi. 292 pp.

Trachischium
Snakes of Asia
Reptiles of India
Reptiles of Nepal
Reptiles described in 1904
Taxa named by Mario Giacinto Peracca